In tennis, the seventh edition of the US Open Series (known as Olympus US Open Series for sponsorships reasons), includes ten hard court tournaments that started on July 19, 2010 in Atlanta and ended in New Haven, Connecticut on August 29, 2010. This edition has scheduled five separate men's tournaments, four women's tournaments, and the Pilot Pen Tennis Tournament that will host both a men's and women's event. The series included two ATP World Tour Masters 1000 and two WTA Premier 5 events to headline the series.

Point distribution for series events 

To be included in the standings and subsequently the bonus prize money, a player had to have countable results from two different tournaments. Players finishing in the top three in the series can earn up to $1 million in extra prize money at the US Open. Roger Federer received the largest US Open pay day of $2.4 million in 2007 after capturing the title in both the US Open Series and the US Open championship.

US Open Series standings
The final standings below include all players who received points in at least two tournaments.

ATP

Notes
1 – Tours – Number of tournaments in US Open Series in which a player has reached the quarterfinals or better, in 250 and 500 series events or the Round of 16 in ATP World Tour Masters 1000 events.
2 – Murray finished first by virtue of head-to-head results because he defeated Federer in Toronto.

WTA

Notes
1 – Tours – Number of tournaments in US Open Series in which a player has reached the quarterfinals or better, in Premier events; or the Round of 16 or better in Premier 5 events.
2 – Kuznetsova finished third based on more total games won in US Open Series events than Azarenka and Sharapova. All three won 9 matches and 19 sets.

2010 schedule

Week 1

ATP – Atlanta Tennis Championships

Americans Andy Roddick and John Isner headlined the event. In the second round, former world number one Lleyton Hewitt was upset by Lukáš Lacko, but the Slovak was unable to follow up the win and instead Kevin Anderson reached his first ATP Tour semifinal. Mardy Fish took out doubles partner Andy Roddick to set up an all-American final against second seeded Isner. Fish outlasted Isner to win the title.

Main Draw Finals

Week 2

ATP – LA Tennis Open

World number four Andy Murray and American Sam Querrey headlined the event. Despite rocky starts in the tournament, Murray and Querrey held their seedings and faced off in the tournament's final. Querrey successfully defended his title by saving a match point and upsetting Murray in two hours and twenty-two minutes.

Main Draw Finals

WTA – Bank of the West Classic

Samantha Stosur and former world number ones Maria Sharapova, Dinara Safina, and Ana Ivanovic headlined the event. Shahar Pe'er became the only seed not to advance to the quarterfinals, falling to Russian Maria Kirilenko in the second round. Victoria Azarenka defeated top seeded Stosur in the semifinals en route to winning the championship.

Main Draw Finals

Week 3

ATP – Legg Mason Tennis Classic 

Wimbledon finalist Tomáš Berdych, Andy Roddick, Los Angeles champion Sam Querrey, and Atlanta champion Mardy Fish headlined the event. The second round welcomed a plethora of upsets with seven of the sixteen seeds falling, including the number six seed Querrey. The upsets continued as Berdych and third seeded Fernando Verdasco were knocked out in the quarters. Wildcard David Nalbandian took advantage of the open draw and won the final against Marcos Baghdatis.

Main Draw Finals

WTA – Mercury Insurance Open

The Serbian pair of Jelena Janković and Ana Ivanovic along with world number five Samantha Stosur headlined the event. By defeating Melanie Oudin, Stosur reached her ninth quarterfinal of the year, breaking away from Li Na who also had eight quarterfinal appearances in 2010. Stosur's stride, however, was cut short by Flavia Pennetta who improved to a 3-0 record over the Australian. In a dramatic final, Svetlana Kuznetsova defeated Agnieszka Radwańska, meaning three players (Victoria Azarenka, Kuznetsova, and Radwańska) will head into Cincinnati with 70 points each on the Olympus US Open Series.

Main Draw Finals

Week 4

ATP - Rogers Masters 

Past champions Rafael Nadal, Roger Federer, Andy Murray, and Novak Djokovic, headlined the event. Of the final sixteen players left in the draw, only eight of them were seeded, with Gaël Monfils being the only player from the bottom half of the seeds to advance to the tournament's third round. Washington champion, David Nalbandian, increased his winning streak to eleven after upsetting world number five Robin Söderling in the third round. Federer won a dramatic night match against Tomáš Berdych to guarantee, for the first time at the Rogers Masters, a final four showdown against the top four ranked men in the world, joining Nadal, Djokovic, and Murray. Murray upset Nadal and Federer and successfully defended his title.

Main Draw Finals

WTA - Western & Southern Financial Group Women's Open

Defending champion Jelena Janković, Caroline Wozniacki, Victoria Azarenka, Kim Clijsters, and Maria Sharapova headlined the event. Azarenka, the Stanford champion, suffered the first major upset of the tournament, losing in the first round to former world number one Ana Ivanovic, who entered the tournament ranked World No. 62 and having lost 17 of her last 29 matches dating back to August 2009, despite having served for the match at 5–4 in the second set. French Open champion Francesca Schiavone was the biggest second round casualty, going down to Elena Vesnina. The third round brought three more stunning results as top seeds Janković and Wozniacki, as well as Vera Zvonareva were all defeated in straight sets. The quarter-finals went to rank, with the exception of Anastasia Pavlyuchenkova, who joined Ivanovic, as a surprise semifinalist of the tournament. The two semi-finals saw Clijsters and Sharapova both advance in contrasting circumstances; Clijsters won through after Ana Ivanovic was forced to retire in the first set due to a foot injury, whilst Sharapova needed three sets to defeat Pavlyuchenkova. Despite having championship points, Sharapova lost to Clijsters in a blockbuster final.

Main Draw Finals

Week 5

ATP - Western & Southern Financial Group Masters

World number one Rafael Nadal joined past champions Roger Federer and Andy Murray along with Novak Djokovic and Andy Roddick to headline the event. Marcos Baghdatis had a dream run to the semifinals defeating Wimbledon finalist Tomáš Berdych and Wimbledon champion Nadal in back-to-back matches. An inspired Mardy Fish also added to his summer success by defeating defending champion, Murray, and Roddick in the quarterfinals and semifinals, respectively. In the final, Federer took out Fish in a match that had only one break of serve.

Main Draw Finals

WTA - Rogers Cup

Jelena Janković, Caroline Wozniacki, US Open Series tournament winners Victoria Azarenka, Svetlana Kuznetsova, and Kim Clijsters joined defending champion Elena Dementieva to headline the event. The tournament saw the withdrawal of big-name Grand Slam champions Venus Williams and Maria Sharapova and also lost its top seed, Janković, in the second round. Azarenka and Kuznetsova rebounded from their first round losses in Cincinnati to reach another semifinal in the US Open Series, while Cincinnati champion, Clijsters, lost her second consecutive match against Vera Zvonareva in the quarterfinals. In the end, Wozniacki would only drop 5 games in each of her last three matches to win the tournament.

Main Draw Finals

Week 6

ATP – Pilot Pen Tennis 

Marcos Baghdatis, Thomaz Bellucci and Fernando González headlined the event. Of the top eight seeds, only top-seeded Baghdatis was able to reach the quarterfinals, where he was then upset by ninth seed Sergiy Stakhovsky. After battling past Viktor Troicki in the semifinals, Denis Istomin fell to Stakhovsky in three sets in the final.

Main Draw Finals

WTA – Pilot Pen Tennis

Two-time defending champion and recent Montreal champion Caroline Wozniacki joined Roland Garros finalist Samantha Stosur and Roland Garros champion Francesca Schiavone to headline the event. All four of the tournament's wildcards reached the quarterfinals, where two of them, Elena Dementieva and Nadia Petrova (who took Ana Ivanovic's original wildcard slot after the Serb withdrew due to the foot injury she suffered at Cincinnati), advanced to the semifinals. Only five days after winning in Montreal, Wozniacki won her third consecutive title in New Haven. The win also secured her first place in the 2010 US Open Series.

Main Draw Finals

References

External links
 

 
July 2010 sports events in the United States
August 2010 sports events in the United States